Anacampsis subactella is a moth of the family Gelechiidae. It was described by Francis Walker in 1864. It is found in Australia.

Adults are dark cinereous (ash grey), the forewings thickly blackish speckled, with some longitudinal black streaks, and with a blackish stripe, which is dilated and abbreviated exteriorly, and contains a short slender whitish streak. The exterior border is slightly convex and very oblique.

References

Moths described in 1864
Anacampsis
Moths of Australia